This is an incomplete record of the rugby players who have represented the New Zealand rugby league team, Auckland Vulcans, in the NSW Cup. In 2007 the team was known as the Auckland Lions and competed in the NSWRL Premier League.

This list does not include Bartercard Cup caps.

Since 2007 four players have played for the Vulcans and the Junior Warriors and then gone on to make their National Rugby League debut with the New Zealand Warriors. They are Russell Packer, Daniel O'Regan, Sonny Fai and Leeson Ah Mau.

In addition to this Ukuma Ta'ai, Malo Solomona, Aidan Kirk and Corey Lawrie have all played for the Vulcans and then made their first grade debut for the Warriors.

List of Players
NRL Statistics are accurate to 31 December 2009

Positions
 FB – Fullback
 WG – Wing
 CE – Centre
 FE – Five-Eighth
 HB – Halfback
 PR – Prop
 HK – Hooker
 SR – Second-Row
 LK – Lock
 UB – Utility Back
 UH – Utility Half

References

External links 
Auckland Vulcans Official Site
Auckland Vulcans at warriors.co.nz
NSW Cup Official Site
ARL Official Site
2008 Auckland Vulcans at rleague.com
2007 Auckland Lions at rleague.com

Rugby league in Auckland
Lists of New Zealand rugby league players